The 1988 Big South Conference baseball tournament  was the postseason baseball tournament for the Big South Conference, held from April 21 through 23 at Taylor Field on the campus of Campbell University in Buies Creek, North Carolina.  Four teams participated in the double-elimination tournament.  The Big South played the season at the NCAA Division I level, but did not receive an automatic bid to the 1988 NCAA Division I baseball tournament.   won the championship for the first time.

Format
The top four finishers from the regular season qualified for the tournament.

Bracket and results

All-Tournament Team

Most Valuable Player
Rob Palentchar was named Tournament Most Valuable Player.  Palentchar was a designated hitter for Campbell.

References

Tournament
Big South Conference Baseball Tournament
Big South baseball tournament
Big South Conference baseball tournament